St. Matthew's Cathedral, or variations on the name, may refer to:

Canada 
St. Matthew's Anglican Cathedral, Brandon, Manitoba
St. Matthew's Cathedral (Timmins), Ontario

Chile
 St. Matthew's Cathedral, Osorno

Sudan
 St. Matthew's Cathedral, Khartoum

United States 
Cathedral of St. Matthew the Apostle (Washington, D.C.)
St. Matthew's Cathedral (South Bend, Indiana)
Cathedral Church of Saint Matthew (Dallas)
St. Matthew's Cathedral (Laramie, Wyoming)